Bicycle safety is the use of  road traffic safety practices to reduce risk associated with cycling. Risk can be defined as the number of incidents occurring for a given amount of cycling. Some of this subject matter is hotly debated: for example, which types of cycling environment or cycling infrastructure is safest for cyclists. The merits of obeying the traffic laws and using bicycle lighting at night are less controversial. Wearing a bicycle helmet may reduce the chance of head injury in the event of a crash.

Most bicycling fatalities occur as a result of collision with a motor vehicle. Studies in multiple countries have found that drivers are at fault in the majority of these crashes.

Crashes 
The first recorded bicycle crash occurred in 1842, reportedly between Kirkpatrick McMillan, an early rider of the velocipede, and a young girl in Glasgow. The report, however, is vague and the identification disputed.

The overall risk of death from a cycling accident in developed countries has diminished over the last 25 years according to a 2017 analysis of OECD statistics. In the United States, cycling remains a more dangerous mode of transportation when compared to automobiles (not considering total distance traveled). According to NPR, the number of bicyclists hit by vehicles has been rising at an alarming rate since the pandemic started, and a leading cause of this poor bicycle infrastructure.

The Centers for Disease Control and Prevention took account of over 32,000 automobile related deaths in 2013  By comparison, WISQUARS the CDC's injury statistics website found just over 1,000 deaths from cycling in 2015. Despite the relative safety compared to automobiles, the number of fatalities and hospitalizations from cycling is significantly greater in the United States compared to other western states such as Germany, Canada, and the Netherlands. In a 2014 analysis, incidence of cycling death took place at a mean rate of 4.7 deaths per 100 million kilometers cycled in the U.S., compared to 1.3 deaths per 100 million kilometers in Germany, 1.0 in the Netherlands, and 1.1 in Denmark. In the United Kingdom, cyclists have half of the rate (killed and serious injury per km) of motorcyclists but eight times the rate for motorists.

Causes of crashes vary according to local conditions. Road conditions, weather, speed, brakes, rider visibility, bicycle and automobile traffic, driving under the influence, riding under the influence, and distracted driving are contributing factors to accidents. Many bicycle crashes are unreported and therefore not included in official statistics.

Findings from an international survey on underreporting of cyclist's most severe collisions found reporting rates ranging between 0% (Israel) and 35% (Germany). Furthermore, there is biasing in the kinds of collisions that appear in official data (i.e. police, hospital, or insurance data). It is known that collisions where a motorised vehicle is not involved as a collision partner i.e. single cyclist, cyclist-pedestrian or cyclist-cyclist collisions have lower odds of being reported to the police. Lower severity collisions (including those that do not result in hospital attendance) can incur significant costs, and result in long-term effects. The Belgian SHAPES project found costs for minor injuries primarily related to loss of productivity, and other intangible costs. The French ESPARR study found that close to half of those who experience a minor injury in a road traffic collision in Rhône (MAIS1 or MAIS2) still experienced regular pain after a year. Therefore, the characteristics of cyclist collisions is an active area of research.

Hazards 

Hazards to bicycles include:
 Failure of drivers to see or anticipate bicycles. This happens especially at cross sections where cyclists are often forced to ride on bike infrastructure to the right (in right-hand drive jurisdictions) of traffic. Especially when large trucks are involved, the cyclist can fall under the wheels of the motor vehicle. (Some trucks are equipped with metal side guards to prevent this.)
 Dooring - When a vehicle door is opened without checking for passing cyclists beforehand and so the cyclist collides with the vehicle door. This is associated with the commonplace layout of streets with vehicles parallel parked near the curb, and cyclists riding between parked vehicles and moving vehicles. Cyclists can protect themselves from dooring by riding outside of the door zone and never right next to parked cars.
 Getting a wheel stuck in a road irregularity, such as a large pothole, railroad track, storm drain, expansion joint, or edge of a driveway. This can cause the bicycle to stop while the rider goes over the handlebars, or it can cause the wheel to travel in a direction different from the rest of the bicycle, which can lead to falling sideways.
 Proceeding past stopped traffic can result in collisions with vehicles entering or exiting a junction or turn. Oncoming bicycles may not be visible to drivers as the stopped vehicles may block them from seeing cyclists until the last minute.  Lane splitting is specifically illegal in some jurisdictions.
 Bicycling in rain or snow can significantly decrease visibility if wearing glasses, goggles, or helmet with wind screen, due to lack of windshield wipers.
 Falling sideways if going too slowly or carrying a heavy, unbalanced load.
 Falling due to lack of traction on slippery surfaces, such as ice, mud, or railroad track.
 Road rage: Some vehicle drivers may try to 'punish' cyclists for what they perceive as selfish behaviour in 'holding them up unnecessarily' and so when overtaking them will pass them too closely or cut in too sharply or sound their horn at them. [This endangerment often leads to prosecution in UK if the cyclist submits a video to bodies such as Operation SNAP ]

Bicyclists are also subject to all the same types of collisions as vehicles, but without the protection of a metal shell - although generally traveling at lower speeds. These risks can be increased when traffic participants violate the rules of the road, such as going the wrong way down a one-way street, failing to stop at a red light, or traveling at night without lights.

Traffic engineering

History

United Kingdom 
During the mid-20th century, the traffic engineering solutions were sought which eased the passage of traffic through the streets and also protected vulnerable road users. In the 1940s, an influential proponent of this ideology was Herbert Alker Tripp, an assistant commissioner of London's Metropolitan Police. Tripp argued in his book Town Planning and Road Traffic that: "If we could segregate pedestrians completely from the
wheeled traffic, we could of course abolish pedestrian casualties".

This philosophy was also pursued by Colin Buchanan; his 1963 report for the UK Government Traffic in Towns, defined future government policy until the end of the century. Buchanan knew that segregation had not been proven to work for cyclists: his 1958 book Mixed Blessing said: "The meagre efforts made to separate cyclists from motor traffic have failed, tracks are inadequate, the problem of treating them at junctions and intersections is completely unsolved, and the attitude of the cyclists themselves to these admittedly unsatisfactory tracks has not been as helpful as it might have been".

Appropriately designed segregated space for cyclists on arterial or interurban routes appears to reduce overall risk. In Ireland, the provision of hard shoulders on interurban routes in the 1970s reportedly resulted in a 50% decrease in accidents. It is reported that the Danes have also found that separate cycle tracks lead to a reduction in rural collisions.

The Netherlands 
The trend away from the bicycle and towards motor cars only began to decrease in the 1970s when Dutch people took to the streets to protest against the high number of child deaths on the roads: in some cases over 500 children were killed in car accidents in the Netherlands in a single year. This protest movement was known as the Stop de Kindermoord (literally "Stop the Child Murder" in Dutch). The success of this movement  — along with other factors, such as the oil shortages of 1973–74 — turned Dutch government policy around and the country began to restrict motor vehicles in its towns and cities and direct its focus on growth towards other forms of transport, with the bicycle perceived as critical in making Dutch streets safer and towns and cities more people-friendly and livable.

Cycling is a common mode of transport in the Netherlands, with 36% of the people listing the bicycle as their most frequent mode of transport on a typical day as opposed to the car by 45% and public transport by 11%. Cycling has a modal share of 27% of all trips (urban and rural) nationwide.

This high modal share for bicycle travel is enabled by unusually flat topography, excellent cycling infrastructure such as cycle paths, cycle tracks, protected intersections, ample bicycle parking and by making cycling routes shorter, quicker and more direct than car routes.

Road design

United States 
Concern over national public health and active transportation have inspired states and municipalities to rethink present traffic engineering. Following the viral popularity of a video created by video game developer Nick Falbo in February 2014, Dutch-style protected intersections began to gain interest with metropolitan planning organizations. By 2015, Davis, California, Salt Lake City, Utah, and Austin, Texas became the first three U.S. cities to feature protected intersections.

Understanding how to effectively reduce cycling accidents and injuries is in part limited by the lack of comprehensive studies regarding municipal infrastructures and the challenge of controlling for the wide range of risks involved with travel by cycle. Despite these statistical limitations, the risk of cycling accidents has been found to be lowest on segregated on-road bike lanes and routes.
Higher risk was associated with cycling on multi-use non-segregated  facilities with a lack of any designated cycling infrastructure (i.e. sidewalks, unmarked roads). Major arterial thoroughfares have also been shown to be more dangerous for cyclists than minor roads.

Signage

United Kingdom 
Following increased pressure from The Times "Cities Fit For Cycling" campaign and from other media in 2012, warning signs are now displayed on the backs of many HGVs. These signs are directed against a common type of accident which occurs when the large vehicle turns left at a junction: a cyclist trying to pass on the nearside can be crushed against the HGV's wheels, especially if the driver cannot see the cyclist. The signs, such as the winning design of the InTANDEM road safety competition launched in March 2012, advocate extra care when passing a large vehicle on the nearside.  This type of 'undertaking' has been promoted in UK with the Highway Code revisions in January 2022. The duty of care is now placed on the larger vehicle and they are required to stop and permit the cycle to undertake them (pass on their left) before they turn left. The aim is to reduce the type of 'left turn' tragedies such as happened to Marta Kraweic. However it remains to be seen if it is a positive move to enable undertaking of left turning vehicles rather than promote caution in holding back until the vehicle ahead completes its manoeuvre and in the knowledge of mirror blind spots existing.

United States 
The Federal Highway Administration has developed various bicycle signage for motorists, which have evolved over recent years. Signs and signals designed exclusively for bicycles are occasionally used to denote multiple use paths and bicycle facilities.

Safety equipment and strategies

Helmets 

Helmet use varies from almost none in some regions to being mandatory for children to being mandatory for all cyclists. Helmets are required in most races. Helmets may help prevent head injuries, but laws that enforce helmet use have also been shown to discourage cycling.

Lights 

Headlights and taillights may be mounted on the bicycle or worn by the cyclist. Bicycle lights can be powered by replaceable batteries, by internal rechargeable batteries, or powered by a hub, bottle or roller dynamo that produces electrical energy when driven by the rotation of the wheels.

Cycling lights are typically of lower power than those on motor vehicles, but well-designed lights are perfectly adequate for the lower speed of bicycles. The best bicycle headlights have beams shaped to efficiently light the road. These are also suitably conspicuous to other road users. In order to be effective, it is best for lights to be securely attached to the bicycle and properly aimed, not mounted on soft bags or loose clothing. In the US, state and local ordinances usually require this.

Audible signaling 

Bells or other audible signaling devices are required equipment in many jurisdictions.

Time of day 

Avoiding cycling at or around dusk is a way to reduce the number of serious bike accidents. The majority of fatal car-bike accidents occur between 6pm and 9pm, likely due to the low-light conditions and potential glare of sunset, combined with traffic still being heavier, especially on weekdays.

Safety education

Development

United Kingdom
Primary safety education has advanced significantly through programmes such as Effective Cycling and the development of Britain's new National Standards for cycle training. In addition to technical improvements in brakes, tyres and bicycle construction generally (for example, it is now rare for a chain to snap and throw the rider when accelerating away from a stop) there are well-understood behavioural models which actively manage the risk posed by other road users.

Cycling experts such as the UK's John Franklin emphasise the importance of assertive cycling and good road positioning. Franklin advocates the use of road positions that will give cyclists a good view of the road, will make cyclists visible to other road-users, and will discourage risky behaviour by other road users; he often advocates the use of a centre-of-lane 'primary riding position' when negotiating hazards.

Motorist education

Dutch Reach 

Various jurisdictions include recommending the Dutch Reach (so named because the practice started in the Netherlands) in driver education materials, to prevent hitting a cyclist with an opening door. For drivers and passengers exiting the left side of the vehicle, this involves opening the left-hand door with the right hand, forcing the person to both open the door more slowly and to turn so that bicycles approaching from behind the car are visible.

Florida 
The Florida Department of Transportation (FDOT), known for its "Arrive Alive" campaign for motorists in the 1970s, has since expanded into active transportation programs such as their recent "Alert Today, Alive Tomorrow" and "Put it Down" campaigns for pedestrians and cyclists. Additionally, FDOT also supports statewide educational programs offering educational materials and bicycle rodeos, such as the Florida PedBike Resource Center, and the University of Miami BikeSafe Program.

Idaho 
In April 2016, Idaho became the first U.S. state to add questions about bicycle and pedestrian safety to the state driver's license exam and educational materials. The revised exam includes a bank of 11 unique questions, of which a minimum of two are automatically generated within every 40-question DMV test.

Rural safety 
Direct rear impacts with cyclists are more likely on arterial/rural roads, and are more likely to kill people on these roads. Data collated by the OECD indicates that rural locations account for 35% or more of cycling fatalities in Denmark, Finland, France, Great Britain, Japan, the Netherlands, and Spain.

See also 
 Hazards of outdoor recreation
 Outline of cycling
 Bikeway safety
 Safety in numbers
 Vehicular cycling
 Motorcycle safety
 Cycling infrastructure

Notes

References

External links 

 Bicycles National Highway Traffic Safety Administration (USA)
 How to reduce the odds of a collision with other vehicle operators
 University of Miami BikeSafe Program Kids' Bicycle Safety and Educational Curriculum for Schools

 
Road safety